Yellow Swans are an American experimental music band from Portland, Oregon. The duo were renowned for their improvisational approach to noise music, creating a unique experience for each live performance. They described their music as "a constantly evolving mass of psychedelic noise that is both physically arresting and psychically liberating". The band consisted of Pete Swanson (vocals, drum machine, electronics) and Gabriel Mindel Saloman (guitar, feedback, electronics). The band announced their split in April 2008.  A live show by Yellow Swans at the festival Oblivion Access was announced in 2023.

Career
The duo formed in Portland, Oregon in 2001. From here they established their own collective art label, JYRK where the band self-released several CD-Rs and cassettes of their music. The JYRK collective also included E*Rock and sometimes Pat Maherr (Sisprum Vish, Indignant Senility, DJ Yo-Yo Dieting). With frequent touring and shows with artists including Tussle, Xiu Xiu and Japanther, the duo moved to Oakland, California for two years. In 2003, they recorded their debut album, Bring The Neon War Home, and continued to tour across the USA.

Their debut album garnered much recognition and soon the band were invited to perform shows across Europe, Australia and New Zealand. In October 2005, Numerical Thief, a Melbourne-based label, debuted the release of the band's second studio album, Psychic Secession. It was later re-mastered and released on LOAD Records the same year, and then released on 12" vinyl by Weird Forest in 2006.

Throughout their existence, the duo used the moniker of D Yellow Swans, where the "D" can be substituted for any word beginning with the letter. This began as a joke when the band formed, and became "a fun take on anti-branding...[it's] not really meant to be elitist though". They used several different names over the past six years, as can be seen in their discography, but are most commonly referred to as simply Yellow Swans.

In April 2008, Pete Swanson announced the band's break up. In an email to Pitchfork Media, Swanson stated "There are no specific reasons why we've come to this point, but both Gabriel [Mindel Saloman] and I have decided that it's in our best interest to move on from the project. Neither of us have any intention to stop playing music anytime soon, but we will not be playing or performing with each other again." The group played their last US show in the city of Chicago.

After over a decade of inactivity, the band began an archival project in 2020, reissuing out of print records and uploading old content to their Bandcamp page.  This was eventually followed by the February 2023 announcement of their first live performance in 15 years at the Austin-based Oblivion Access Festival in June 2023.

Discography

2002
 Gnrl Motor Skills/PA Swans CD-R
 Live at Kimo's CD-R (Self released)
 Ded Yellow Swans CD-R (Collective Jyrk) - as Ded Yellow Swans
 Free CD-R (Collective Jyrk) - as Detained Yellow Swans
 Manik Tiks CD-R (Collective Jyrk) - as Disk Yellow Swans
 EPX CD-R (Self released)
 PDX TRPX CD-R (Self released)

2003
 Deep Yellow Swans CD-R (Collective Jyrk) - as Deep Yellow Swans
 Duh Yellow Swans CD-R (Collective Jyrk) - as Duh Yellow Swans
 Detestifi Yellow Swans CD-R (Collective Jyrk) - as Detestifi Yellow Swans
 Against Sleep And Nightmare CD-R (Collective Jyrk) as Dyad Yellow Swans
 Business Card CD-R (Das Fort) - as Decapitation Yellow Swans
 Yellow Swans CD-R (Self released)
 Live From Men's And Women's Bathrooms, The Placebo, Arcata, CA 3" CD-R (Tape Mountain/Jyrk/Deathbombarc) - with Gang Wizard
 Die Yellow Swans/John Wiese Split 7" (Collective Jyrk/Helicopter)
 Dreamed Yellow Swans 12" (Collective Jyrk) - as Dreamed Yellow Swans

2004
 Bring The Neon War Home CD (Narnack Records)
 Drill Yellow Swans CD-R (SNSE Records) - as Drill Yellow Swans
 Basement Ghost 7" (Helicopter) - with John Wiese
 Live In The Police State Capitol 12" (Weird Forest) - as Demos Yellow Swans

2005
 Live During War Crimes CD (Release the Bats) - as Dove Yellow Swans
 Drowning Yellow Swans & Jim Altieri CD-R (Carbon) - as Drowning Yellow Swans
 Drowned Yellow Swans 3" CD-R (Chondritic Sound ) - as Drowned Yellow Swans
 Yeh Yellow Swans 3" CD-R (Collective Jyrk) - as Yeh Yellow Swans
 Yellow Swans/Axolotl CD-R (Collective Jyrk)
 Yellow Swans/Axolotl/Gerritt CD-R (Collective Jyrk)
 Copper/Silver 2xCD-R (Collective Jyrk) - with Grey Daturas
 Humming Lattice Flowers CD-R (Collective Jyrk) - with Skaters
 Australian Tour EP CD-R (Heathen Skulls) - with Grey Daturas
 Live 5-6-04 US Tour aka: War CD-R (Hung Like A Horse?!) - as Demonic Yellow Swans
 Psychic Secession CD (Numerical Thief/LOAD Records)
 Dreamed Yellow Swans CD (PACrec110/Deleted Art) - as Dreamed Yellow Swans
 Live at Camp Blood CD (Troniks) - with The Cherry Point
 Doorendoorslechte Yellow Swans 3" CD (Ultra Eczema) - as Doorendoorslechte Yellow Swans
 Draught Yellow Swans 7" (Deathbombarc) - as Draught Yellow Swans
 Against Sleep And Nightmare 12" (Weird Forest) - as Dyad Yellow Swans

2006
 Drift Yellow Swans CD (Acuarela) - as Drift Yellow Swans
 Live At Sound & Fury CD-R (Sound & Fury Records)
 They Do Not Always Remember CD (Oedipus Records) - with Moth Drakula
 Live During War Crimes Vol.II CD (Release the Bats) - as Dove Yellow Swans
 Global Clone CD (PacRec) - as Doubled Yellow Swans
 Yellow Swans/Birchville Cat Motel CD (Important)
 Drift Yellow Swans 12" (Root Strata) - as Drift Yellow Swans
 Psychic Secession 2x12" (Weird Forest)
 Copper/Silver 2x12" (Olde English Spelling Bee) - with Grey Daturas
 Yellow Swans/Devillock Split 7" (Modern Radio)

2007
 Yellow Swans/Warmth Split 7" (DNT Records)
 Descension Yellow Swans 12" (Three Lobed Recordings) - as Descension Yellow Swans
 Descension Yellow Swans CD (Acuarela) - as Descension Yellow Swans
 Drowner Yellow Swans cassette (Tape Room) - as Drowner Yellow Swans
 Yellow Swans/Robedoor Split 7" (Arbor)
 Yellow Swans/Goslings Split 7" (Not Not Fun)
 At All Ends CD (Load)
 Mort Aux Vaches (Staalplaat)

2010
Going Places (Type) - Announced as the final Yellow Swans album
Being There (Type) - Going Places bonus CD, only available through limited edition vinyl of Going Places.

References

External links
 Official website
 MySpace page
 Band profile at Numerical Thief
 Band profile at LOAD Records
 Interview at Grooves Magazine
 Review of Live During War Crimes at Grooves Magazine

Musical groups established in 2001
Musical groups disestablished in 2008
Musical groups from Portland, Oregon
Electronic music groups from Oregon
American experimental musical groups
American noise rock music groups
2001 establishments in Oregon
2008 disestablishments in Oregon
Load Records artists